Kocc Barma Fall or Kotch Barma Fall, more commonly known as Kocc Barma, born Birima Maxuréja Demba Xolé Faal  (1586-1655) was a Cayorian philosopher and a member of the laman class. Kocc Barma was an Ajoor-Ajoor — a Serer demonym, meaning an inhabitant of the Kingdom of Cayor (Wa Kajoor in Wolof), now part of present-day Senegal.

He is considered to be the greatest Senegalese thinker and philosopher, and one of the prominent figures of African philosophy. His fertile imagination, his quick wit and his metaphorical sayings are part of the universe of Wolof culture. During his lifetime, he was particularly concerned about the injustice of damels, whom he viewed as tyrannical.

In popular culture
In Ousmane Sembène's film Guelwaar, the actor playing the role of Guelwaar recited one of Kocc Barma's proverbs in the film. In addressing the crowd celebrating the food aid they've been given by white people in the presence of the European delegation and the country's political elite, Guelwaar took to the stage voicing his repulsion and shame of what he had witnessed before his very eyes, and reminded the crowd of the values of true African dignity and honour. In expressing his repulsion of the African leaders begging European powers for aid, and the humiliation and indignity thereof, he said: 

"Our ancestor Kocc Barma said:" 
"If you want to kill a proud man, give him what he needs to live everyday. In the long run, you've made him a serf."

Following that speech, the crowd refused to accept the food aid, to the dismay of the country's political elite and the Western delegation on the stage. 

David Murphy states that "Kocc Barma's words and acts have passed into Senegalese folklore to such an extent that proverbs are often introduced by the phrase 'Kocc Barma said', whether this is true or not".

References

More links
History of Senegal
History of The Gambia

Biography
Ware, Rudolph T., The Walking Qurʼan: Islamic Education, Embodied Knowledge, and History in West Africa, UNC Press Books (2014), p. 101,   (retrieved 18 Jan 2019)
 Murphy, David, Sembene: Imagining Alternatives in Film & Fiction. James Currey Publishers (2000), p. 63. 
Diagne, Léon Sobel, « Le problème de la philosophie africaine » (2004), p. 10 (archived by French Wikipedia)

Further reading
Kesteloot, Lilyan; Mbodj, Chérif (ed.), Contes et mythes wolof, Nouvelles éd. africaines, Dakar (1983), p. 232,  
Lalèyê, Issiaka-Prosper, 20 questions sur la philosophie africaine, L'Harmattan (2010), 2e éd, p. 150, 
Diagne, Léon, Kotch Barma Fall : un philosophe sénégalais du xviie siècle, Dakar, Université de Dakar (1979), p. 125 p. (Mémoire de Maîtrise)

External links
« Village de Kocc Barma Fall : Ndiongué Fall, sanctuaire de la tradition orale » (by Mbaye Sarr DIAKHATE & Oumar NDIAYE (text); Awa TOUNKARA (photos)) [in] Le Soleil, 28 Sep 2008, (archived by French Wikipedia)

Senegalese philosophers
1586 births
1655 deaths